Meditations – Live at Dug  is a 1972 live album recorded by American jazz pianist Mal Waldron. This is his solo album recorded live in the jazz club Dug in the Shinjuku district of Tokyo. The record was re-released in 2016 on CD.

Reception
A reviewer of Dusty Groove stated "A sublime solo performance from Mal Waldron – the kind of unbridled, spiritual work he started giving us once he spent a lot of time overseas – sounds that are light years away from his American records of just a few short years before! Waldron is incredible here – and his ability to work in different ways with each hand on the piano almost makes it feel as if the performance is a duet, instead of a solo – as Mal can lay down modal rhythms with one hand, create incredible flights on the keys with the other – all while holding onto a sense of rhythm and melody that's completely wonderful throughout. Unlike some other Waldron records of this nature, which might go a bit outside – this one is free, but never "out" – and instead has Mal opening up beautifully on the titles "The Blues Suite", "Chairo No Hitomi", "The Stone Garden Of Ryoanji", "Summertime", "All Alone", and "Left Alone"."

Track listing

Personnel
Mal Waldron – piano 
Keijiro Kubota – design 
Takashi Watanabe – recording mixer
Takashi Arihara – photographer
Tetsuya Shimoda – producer

References

Solo piano jazz albums
RCA Victor albums
Mal Waldron albums
1972 albums